Oleksiy Ivanovych Kovalov (19 January 1989 – 28 August 2022) was a Ukrainian politician. A few months before his death, he had started collaborating with Russia during the 2022 Russian invasion of Ukraine.

Biography
Kovalov was elected in the 2019 Ukrainian parliamentary election as a member of the Servant of the People party after winning electoral district (first-past-the-post electoral system) 186 (centred around Hola Prystan) with 35.12% of the votes. He entered Ukraine's national parliament, the Verkhovna Rada in August 2019.

Two months into the 2022 Russian invasion of Ukraine, at the beginning of April 2022 Kovalov stated that he was in Russian occupied Hola Prystan "to work in his electoral district." He did not report to parliament where he was or what he was doing.

On 28 April, the Servant of the People faction announced that it had suspended Kovalov's membership in the party and the faction. Kovalov was then expelled from the Servant of the People party on 3 May 2022.

On 8 June 2022, Kovalov admitted on his Facebook page to collaborating with the Russian occupiers in the Kherson Oblast.

On 22 June 2022, it was reported that Kovalov had been killed in Kherson Oblast at the age of 33. However, on 30 June 2022, Russian media released a video of Kovalov in the hospital, in which he accused the Ukrainian Security Service of attempting to assassinate him. Also on 30 June 2022, First Deputy Chairman of the Verkhovna Rada Oleksandr Kornienko stated that Kovalov's mandate could be removed only after a court ruling because the Ukrainian Constitution does not include collaborationism as grounds for depriving an MP of their mandate.

According to Ukrainian authorities at the beginning of July, Kovalov assumed the position of deputy created by the Russian occupying administration, "head of the government of Kherson Oblast".

On 28 August 2022, several Telegram channels reported the murder of Kovalov. The following day the Investigative Committee of Russia confirmed Kovalov's death. According to them, Kovalev died as a result of a gunshot wound during an attack at his place of residence in Zaliznyi Port on 28 August 2022. A woman who lived with Kovalev reportedly was also killed.

On 7 October 2022, the Russian President Vladimir Putin posthumously awarded him with the Order of Courage for "dedication and courage".
	
Since no official death certificate could have been received by parliament, necessary for his termination of office as a People's Deputy of Ukraine, Kovalyov will technically stay a member of the Verkhovna Rada until the next Ukrainian parliamentary election or until an official death certificate is received.

References

1989 births
2022 deaths
Servant of the People (political party) politicians
Ninth convocation members of the Verkhovna Rada
Odesa Law Academy alumni
People from Kherson Oblast
Ukrainian collaborators with Russia during the 2022 Russian invasion of Ukraine
20th-century Ukrainian people
21st-century Ukrainian politicians
Assassinated Ukrainian politicians
Deaths by firearm in Ukraine
People murdered in Ukraine
People killed in the 2022 Russian invasion of Ukraine
Civilians killed in the Russian invasion of Ukraine
2022 murders in Europe
Recipients of the Order of Courage
Political violence in Ukraine